Spoils of War or The Spoils of War may refer to:

Warfare concepts 
 Prize of war, regarded as legitimate
 War looting, regarded as illegitimate
 Wartime sexual violence by extension
 The Spoils of War (symposium), 1995 symposium on art plundered around World War II

Television and film 
 The Spoils of War, British television serial of 1980–1981
"Spoils of War", 1988 Broadway production by Michael Weller
"Spoils of War", 1994 film directed by David Greene
 Spoils of War (film), 2000 Argentinian documentary
 Spoils of War (film), 2009 movie with a plot based on Operation Bernhard
 "Spoils of War" (Stargate Atlantis), season 4 episode
 "Spoils of War", season 2 episode of Men Behaving Badly (U.S. TV series)
 "Spoils of War", Sea Patrol (season 5) episode
 "The Spoils of War" (Game of Thrones), an episode of the seventh season of Game of Thrones

Other 
 Al-Anfal (Arabic for "The Spoils of War"), the eighth chapter of the Qur'an 
 Ghanima (disambiguation) (Arabic for "The Spoils of War")
 The Spoils of War, novel by Gordon Kent (Christian Cameron)